Poljak is a surname. Notable people with the surname include:

 Allegra Poljak (born 1999), Serbian professional footballer
 Eszter Poljak (born 1952), Yugoslav sports shooter
 Maja Poljak (born 1983), Croatian volleyball player
 Mateo Poljak (born 1989), Croatian professional footballer
 Miroslav Poljak (1944–2015), Croatian water polo player
 Roberto Poljak (1932–2019), Argentine biophysicist and immunologist
 Stjepan Poljak (born 1983), Croatian football midfielder
 Željko Poljak (born 1959), Croatian basketball coach

Croatian surnames
Serbian surnames